The Rabbit Hash Historic District in Rabbit Hash, Kentucky was added to the National Register of Historic Places on December 4, 2003.  It includes , 12 buildings, 6 structures, and 3 objects around 10021-10410 Lower River Rd.  The Rabbit Hash General Store, one of the addresses in the District, had already been listed since February 2, 1989.

References

External links 
"Rabbit Hash," Chronicles of Boone County, Boone County Public Library (KY)

National Register of Historic Places in Boone County, Kentucky
Geography of Boone County, Kentucky
Historic districts on the National Register of Historic Places in Kentucky